Kenmore Air Harbor  is a public-use seaplane base at the northern end of Lake Washington and
 south of the central business district of Kenmore, Washington, U.S. It primarily serves western Washington and parts of southwestern British Columbia. The base is primarily used by regional seaplane airline Kenmore Air.

Facilities and aircraft 
It has two seaplane landing areas: 16/34 is 10,000 by 1,000 feet (3,048 x 305 m) and 18/36 is 3,000 by 1,000 feet (914 x 305 m).

For the 12-month period ending December 31, 2007, the airport had 48,300 aircraft operations, an average of 132 per day: 83% air taxi and 17% general aviation. At that time there were 60 single-engine aircraft based at this airport.

Airlines and destinations

Passenger

In the arts 
Kenmore Air Harbor is the base for the "San Juan Island Run" mission supplied with Microsoft Flight Simulator X.

References

External links 
 Kenmore Air
 Aerial photo as of 10 July 1990 from USGS The National Map
 

Airports in King County, Washington
Seaplane bases in the United States
Airports established in 1946
1946 establishments in Washington (state)